Roger Behm (25 March 1929, in Luxembourg City – 30 November 2005) was a boxer from Luxembourg.

Behm was a member of the Luxembourgish Olympic boxing team at the 1948 Summer Olympics in London. He was eliminated in the first round of the bantamweight competition on points by the Irishman Willie Lenihan.

External links
Roger Behm's profile at Sports Reference.com
Association Luxembourgeoise des Olympiens

Bantamweight boxers
Luxembourgian male boxers
Olympic boxers of Luxembourg
Boxers at the 1948 Summer Olympics
Sportspeople from Luxembourg City
1929 births
2005 deaths